The 2019 European Parliament election for the election of the delegation from the United Kingdom was held on May 23, 2019. These were the last elections to the European Parliament to be held before Brexit.

Only constituencies in Great Britain used party-list proportional representation, as in Northern Ireland the single transferable vote system is used.

Brexit Party 
The Brexit Party was newly founded for the 2019 European Parliament election. On 8 February 2019, party leader Nigel Farage stated he would stand as a candidate for the party in any potential future European Parliament elections contested in the United Kingdom. MEPs Steven Woolfe and Nathan Gill, also formerly of UKIP, stated that they would also stand for the party.

South East England 
The Brexit Party had a list of 10 candidates for the 10 seats available in the South East of England. The top four were elected.

South West England

Change UK 

The party announced on 23 April that it would stand a full slate of candidates in Great Britain for the European Parliament elections, including Ashworth, writer Rachel Johnson (sister of Conservative MPs Jo and Boris Johnson); former BBC journalist Gavin Esler; former Conservative MPs Stephen Dorrell and Neil Carmichael; former Labour MEP Carole Tongue; former Labour MPs Roger Casale and Jon Owen Jones; former Liberal Democrat MEP Diana Wallis; and the former deputy Prime Minister of Poland Jacek Rostowski. None of the Change UK candidates won any seats.

London 

Ali Sadjady Naiery, a mixed martial arts fighter and former Conservative Party candidate for Ealing Borough Council, was originally placed sixth on Change UK's London list, but withdrew and was replaced after he was found to have made a tweet saying that Romanian pickpockets on the London Underground made him want Brexit.

South East England

South West England

Scotland

Conservative Party

South East England

South West England

Green Party of England and Wales 
The Green Party of England and Wales fielded candidates in every constituency in England and Wales.

East Midlands

East of England

London

North East England

North West England

South East England

South West England

Wales

Labour Party 
The Labour Party stood candidates in all constituencies in Great Britain.

South East England 
The Labour Party had a list of 10 candidates for the 10 seats available in the South East of England.

South West England

Scottish National Party 
The Scottish National Party stood 6 candidates for all the seats in Scotland.

UKIP

South West England

References

See also 

 Party-list proportional representation

2019 European Parliament election
British political candidates
European Parliament elections in the United Kingdom
Party lists